Aleksandar Stojanović (born 22 June 1983) is a Serbian handball player for RK Vranje 1957.

Career
Over the course of his career, Stojanović played in Slovenia (Celje and Koper), Macedonia (Vardar and Metalurg Skopje), Switzerland (Kadetten Schaffhausen), Hungary (Balmazújvárosi KK), Turkey (Antalyaspor), France (Istres) and his native Serbia (Vrbas, Železničar 1949, Partizan and now RK Vranje 1957).

At international level, Stojanović represented Serbia in two major tournaments (2009 World Men's Handball Championship and 2010 European Men's Handball Championship).

Honours
Celje
 Slovenian First League: 2006–07, 2007–08
 Slovenian Cup: 2006–07
Kadetten Schaffhausen
 Swiss Handball League: 2009–10, 2010–11, 2011–12, 2013–14, 2014–15, 2015–16

References

External links
 EHF record
 LNH record
 MKSZ record

1983 births
Living people
Sportspeople from Jagodina
Serbian male handball players
Competitors at the 2009 Mediterranean Games
Mediterranean Games medalists in handball
Mediterranean Games gold medalists for Serbia
RK Vardar players
Expatriate handball players
Serbian expatriate sportspeople in Slovenia
Serbian expatriate sportspeople in North Macedonia
Serbian expatriate sportspeople in Switzerland
Serbian expatriate sportspeople in Hungary
Serbian expatriate sportspeople in Turkey
Serbian expatriate sportspeople in France